Christian Kalvenes (born 8 March 1977) is a retired Norwegian footballer who played as a defender. During his career he had three spells with SK Brann and played for Åsane and Sogndal. He also played abroad for Dundee United in Scotland and Burnley in England.

Career

Norway
Christian Kalvenes was born in the city of Bergen and started his senior career with SK Brann, but played only one match. 10 years and one day after his first match, he played his second league appearance for the club, against FC Lyn Oslo 29 May 2005. In the meantime, he played for both Åsane and Sogndal. Despite the fact that he was one of the great talents of Brann in the 1990s, he never managed to establish himself in the A-team squad. After several good seasons as a central defender in Åsane he was taken to a Sogndal teams vying for promotion to the Premier League in the summer of 2000. His breakthrough in the Norwegian Premier League came with Sogndal for whom he made 67 appearances scoring 4 goals. In 2003, he returned to SK Brann where he managed only 11 appearances and no goals in 3 years. He played mainly at left, helping the club win the qualifier against Vålerenga same year scored more away goals.

In the next few seasons he was a safe choice at left back Sogndal in addition to score numerous goals on free kicks. In front of the 2004 season, he was brought back to Brann, but where he went mostly injured forward to his debut in 2005. Ironically, he was back from injury around the same time as his rival on the left back, Erlend Hanstveit. After Hanstveit's recovery, he was forced to find himself as a substitute.

Dundee United
On 2 August 2006, Kalvenes joined Dundee United for a fee of around £50,000. In his competitive debut for United, Kalvenes scored the second goal in a 2–2 draw against Rangers at Ibrox. In August 2007, Kalvenes was "harshly sent off" against Kilmarnock, a decision which gave Kilmarnock an "undeserved victory." The red card was later overturned.

In January 2008, it was reported that Kalvenes was likely to leave United at the end of his contract and return to Norway; something the player admitted considering in March, although adding it would be "difficult to walk away" and "tough to leave". Following an injury in mid-April, Kalvenes confirmed he had played his last match for the club, and that he would return to Norway at the end of the season to be closer to his family. In his time at Tannadice Park, Kalvenes made 48 appearances scoring 2 goals. Kalvenes scored on his competitive debut at Ibrox as United drew 2–2 with Glasgow Rangers in the second game of the 2006–07 season.
That was to be his only goal of a season when he established himself as a regular, playing over 30 games for the Terrors. Midway through his second season at Tannadice Park, the left back hinted at a return to Scandinavia in the summer of 2008, when his contract expired. However, he continued to be a regular starter and ended his Dundee United career as he started in his penultimate appearance in April 2008 – with a goal against Rangers. And after temporarily shelving immediate plans to raise a family back in Scandinavia, he signed a two-year deal with Burnley in June 2008.

Burnley
Burnley snapped up Kalvenes on a Bosman transfer in June 2008. His move to Burnley came as a surprise as it was believed that he would be heading back home to Norway, as stated by the player when he left Dundee Utd at the end of the 2007–2008 season. The 31-year-old Norwegian left full back, pronounced 'Kal-Ven-Es', signed a two-year deal with the Clarets after his contract with the Scottish club expired. He was to play an important role in the Clarets promotion winning campaign, making twenty-one league appearances with his only goal of the season proving to be a vital one. It came in March at Bloomfield Road on a cold, wet Tuesday evening when his late strike secured an important 1–0 victory over Lancashire rivals Blackpool. The marauding left backs' goal against Blackpool proved to be a pivotal moment in the play-off surge by the Lancashire outfit.

He played an important part in helping Burnley gain promotion from the Championship to the Premier League via the play-offs. On his Premiership debut in August 2009, he became the first Premiership player from the city of Bergen. On 8 April 2010, Kalvenes had his contract terminated by mutual consent.

Brann
On 14 June 2010 Kalvenes signed for Brann for the third time of his career. He retired after the 2012-season.

Outside football
Christian Kalvenes is noted for being one of the few footballers in the Norwegian Tippeliga to have held a second profession outside football. He is currently working as a marketing manager for Chess Communications, a virtual network operator. Prior to this, he was also acknowledged for his interest in academics and education. He holds a Master of Business Administration degree. During his spell at Burnley F.C and Dundee United, he often preached about the importance of pursuing an academic career to High School and College students. Currently, he is an active member in the campaign against bullying for Norwegian schools.

Honours

Dundee United
 Scottish League Cup Runner-up: 1
 2007–08

Burnley
 Football League Championship play-offs Winner: 1
 2008–09

See also
 Dundee United F.C. season 2006-07
 Dundee United F.C. season 2007-08

References

External links
 

Norwegian footballers
Eliteserien players
Scottish Premier League players
English Football League players
Premier League players
SK Brann players
Åsane Fotball players
Sogndal Fotball players
Dundee United F.C. players
Burnley F.C. players
Footballers from Bergen
Expatriate footballers in England
Expatriate footballers in Scotland
Norwegian expatriate sportspeople in Scotland
Norwegian expatriate footballers
1977 births
Living people
Association football defenders